The women's team tournament of the 2022 World Team Table Tennis Championships was held from 30 September to 8 October 2022.

China won the final against Japan, after not losing a single match during the tournament.

Format
The 28 teams were drawn into six groups. After a round robin in each group, the top two teams in group and four highest-ranked third-placed teams played in the knockout stage. A team match consisted of five singles matches, where each singles match was decided in best-of-5 games.

Draw
The draw took place on 28 September. The top six teams in the world ranking were seeded as top of each group.

Group stage
All times are local (UTC+8).

Group 1

Group 2

Group 3

Group 4

Group 5

Group 6

Knockout stage

Round of 16

Quarterfinals

Semifinals

Final

References

External links
ITTF website
WotldTableTennis website

2022 World Team Table Tennis Championships